Durham Hosiery Mill No. 15, also known as Mebane Yarn Mills, Inc. and Rockfish-Mebane Yarn Mills, Inc., is a historic hosiery mill building located at Mebane, Alamance County, North Carolina. It was built in 1922, and is a two-story, 20-bay, cast-in-place concrete mill building. Two-story concrete pilasters define each window bay.  It features a centrally-placed, two-story, projecting square tower. A nine bay addition was built in 1966. The mill closed in 2001.

It was added to the National Register of Historic Places in 2010.

References

Industrial buildings and structures on the National Register of Historic Places in North Carolina
Industrial buildings completed in 1922
National Register of Historic Places in Alamance County, North Carolina
Textile mills in North Carolina
Hosiery